O Ritmo Que Conquistou o Brasil! (The Rhythm what won the Brazil! in English) is the third album of Banda Calypso, released in 2002, in place of the famous "stolen CD".

Production and rhythms 
With arrangements and production Chimbinha the band returns with different rhythms on his album that brings calypso, carimbó, lambada, zouk, among others genres. The album also features the participation of several composers, among them the singer Beto Barbosa, who composed the music, Só Vai Dar Eu e Você and Zouk Love, both sung by singer Dinho. The band brings a very romantic side with ballads like Desaz as Malas, Não faz Sentido and Maridos e Esposas. Still have a block with songs of carimbó sung by Dinho, among other music and dance rhythms such as Esperando Por Você, Love You Mon Amour, Temporal, among others.

Singles
The album was well received, and their first single Temporal had great acceptance, with a more danceable rhythm brought a great start.

The next investment was in Maridos e Esposas, a romantic ballad that was present in several collections which brought together various artists. It was a song that had good appearance.

To complete the singles, the song Chamo Por Você had great commitment, but beyond these singles were official non-singles as the song Me Telefona, Príncipe Encantado and Só Vai Dar Eu e Você.

Track listing

References

2002 albums
Portuguese-language albums
Banda Calypso albums